Whitridge is a surname, and may refer to:

Frederick W. Whitridge (1852–1916), President of the Third Avenue Railway Company
William Oswald Whitridge (1853–1919), Australian cricketer
W. W. R. Whitridge (c.1824–1861), newspaper editor in South Australia

See also
SS Mary Whitridge